The Port of Ceuta is a passenger and cargo port located on the North African coast, in the Strait of Gibraltar, belonging to the Spanish autonomous city of Ceuta.

Description 
Finished in 1942, it reached its pinnacle in activity during the time of the Spanish protectorate in Morocco, as it served the inland area, declining after the independence of Morocco in 1956. It is managed by the port authority of the same name. The contemporary activity of the port is centered in the obtention of provisions by the local market, in vessel supplies, the ferry service linking to ports in the Iberian Peninsula and its role as centre for providing logistic and industrial services. Despite of the closed customs with Morocco the port also has a role for the entry of products to Morocco, through the means of closeted smuggling by informal "porters" crossing the border with personal luggage. Most of the cargo shipping is ro-ro.

References

Bibliography 
 
 
 

Ceuta
Buildings and structures in Ceuta
Ports and harbours in Africa